The canton of Uzès is an administrative division of the Gard department, southern France. Its borders were modified at the French canton reorganisation which came into effect in March 2015. Its seat is in Uzès.

It consists of the following communes:
 
Aigaliers
Arpaillargues-et-Aureillac
Aubussargues
Baron
La Bastide-d'Engras
Blauzac
Bourdic
La Bruguière
La Calmette
La Capelle-et-Masmolène
Collorgues
Dions
Flaux
Foissac
Fontarèches
Garrigues-Sainte-Eulalie
Montaren-et-Saint-Médiers
Pougnadoresse
Saint-Chaptes
Saint-Dézéry
Sainte-Anastasie
Saint-Hippolyte-de-Montaigu
Saint-Laurent-la-Vernède
Saint-Maximin
Saint-Quentin-la-Poterie
Saint-Siffret
Saint-Victor-des-Oules
Sanilhac-Sagriès
Serviers-et-Labaume
Uzès
Vallabrix

References

Cantons of Gard